The Ferrocarril de Antofagasta a Bolivia (British company name: Antofagasta (Chili) & Bolivia Railway or FCAB for short)  is a private railway operating in the northern provinces of Chile. It proved that a railway with such a narrow gauge could do the work of a standard gauge railway, and influenced the construction of other railways such as the Estrada de Ferro Oeste de Minas.

Route 
The railway started at the Chilean port of Antofagasta. It proceeded up the front range of the Andes to Ollagüe on the Bolivian border, requiring one notable piece of civil engineering, the Loa viaduct. However, in 1914 the line was rerouted upstream of the Conchi reservoir and trains no longer ran across the viaduct. Across the Bolivian pampas the lined reached Uyuni and Oruro. A number of branches were added to reach various mining fields.

History 
The history of the railway dates back to 1872 with the grant of a concession by the government of Bolivia to Melbourne Clarke & Co, the territory around Antofagasta being part of Bolivia at this date.  The railway was organised as the Antofagasta Nitrate & Railway Company. Construction started in 1873, with the first section opening late in that year, motive power provided by mules.  Steam locomotives were introduced in 1876, and by 1879 the railway had extended about  into the interior.

War broke out in 1879 between Chile on one side, and Peru and Bolivia on the other. One of the causes of the war was an attempt by the Bolivian government to levy back taxes on the railway.  The "War of the Pacific" ended in 1883, and Chile gained the region around Antofagasta as well as part of Peru.

Control of the railway passed to the Company Huanchaca of Bolivia in 1887, who subsequently floated the railway on the London stock exchange in 1888 as the FCAB. The Huanchilaca company retained the right to operate the railway for a further 15 years. The line reached Oruro in Bolivia, the end of the  section, in 1892, and branches continued to be added over subsequent years.

British business interests resumed control of the entire system in 1903. Traffic reached a point where the port of Antofagasta was unable to cope. A new port was opened to the north at Mejillones in 1906, together with a new line bypassing Antofagasta. In 1909 the FCAB purchased the FC Caleta Coloso a Aguas Blancas, a railway operating in the mineral-rich desert regions south of Antofagasta. Although also of  gauge, the FCCCAB was never integrated into the FCAB, and always operated as a separate entity.

The entire region is a desert, with almost no rainfall. The company constructed a system of pipes and reservoirs to bring water for the railway from the high Andes, eventually becoming responsible for supplying Antofagasta with water as well.

Bolivian government interests supported the construction of a railway between Oruro and the Bolivian capital, La Paz, and this line was opened in stages between 1908 and 1913 This line was constructed to metre gauge, and was leased to the FCAB. The FCAB now had two operating divisions, one using  gauge, the other .

Bogie exchange 
The FCAB already interchanged with metre gauge railways running north–south in western Chile, and there was the prospect of connections with lines from Argentina. Thus, in 1913, the FCAB board made a decision to convert the line to metre gauge throughout. Some gauge conversion work was done in 1916, however World War I intervened, and most work was not done until 1928. In the meantime, the railway became proficient in changing bogies on freight cars between gauges at interchange points. Some branch lines and connecting railways were never converted, and continued to operate as  gauge railways into the 1960s.

The Bolivian section of the line was taken over by the Bolivian government in 1964, and in the early 1970s, the Chilean government investigated nationalizing the line. In 1982, control of the company passed on to Chilean interests, and the head office moved from London to Antofagasta. The railway is now part of the transport division of mining company Antofagasta plc.

Traffic 

Primary traffic on the railway has always been mineral, first with nitrate (an essential ingredient of explosives prior to World War I) and as of 2020 copper being very important. Sulphuric acid is transported uphill and copper comes down.  The railway also transported concentrates of other minerals and lithium brine.   Traffic between Bolivia and northern Chile grew in importance and continues to this day.

Passengers were catered for in earlier days by a luxury train with sleeping and dining carriages, one of the few trains on  gauge anywhere in the world with these conveniences. The International, as the train was called, continued to operate on the metre gauge after gauge conversion. The train was later replaced by railcars, however no passenger service is provided today except south of Oruro with the Wari Wari del Sur running several times a week and serving several stations en route.

Locomotives

Steam

The railway commenced operations with a small fleet of 4-6-0 locomotives, built by Robert Stephenson & Company  In 1884 the same company supplied an unusual Webb compound locomotive, with a 4-2-4-2T wheel arrangement. Two high-pressure cylinders drove the two coupled axles, while a single low-pressure cylinder drove the single axle.

The takeover by the Huanchaca company saw the first of a fleet of 2-6-0 locomotives built by the Baldwin Locomotive Works arrive in 1889. The relationship quickly developed, and Baldwin supplied an outside-framed 2-4-2 in 1890. This was the first outside-framed loco on the FCAB, and the first application of outside frames to a narrow gauge locomotive by Baldwin. The use of outside frames allowed construction of larger locomotives, and by 1892 Baldwin were supplying large 2-8-0 locomotives.

As the railway laid heavier rails, larger locomotives were introduced, built by both Baldwin and other American builders. The resumption of control by British interests lead to the introduction of some British constructed locomotives. Initial response was that the British locomotives were not as rugged or easy to repair as the American locomotives. However subsequent tests found British locomotives steamed better, resulting in savings in fuel costs that outweighed the extra maintenance costs.

No  gauge locomotives were constructed after the 1913 decision to convert to metre gauge. However the locomotives the FCAB were certainly amongst the largest constructed for  gauge. A 2-6+6-2T Kitson Meyer constructed in 1912 was perhaps the heaviest locomotive ever constructed for this gauge.

Development of metre gauge locomotives paralleled that of the 2 ft 6 in gauge, including a fleet of six Meyer types built by Beyer, Peacock & Company in 1913.  Many of the 2 ft 6 in gauge locos were converted to metre gauge in 1928. A class of 4-8-2+2-8-4 Beyer Garratts was also introduced in 1928.  Post war developments included a fleet of modern 4-8-2 locomotives from Vulcan Foundry in England in 1954, as well as further Beyer-Garratts.

Diesel

The railway began dieselization in 1958, but some steam locomotives were still in operation 20 years later.

See also 
 Arica–La Paz railway
 FC Caleta Coloso a Aguas Blancas
 Salta–Antofagasta railway
 Maria Elena - Tocopilla railway
 Rail transport in Chile
 Rail transport in Bolivia

Sources

External links 

 Historia del Ferrocarril Arica-La Paz, 1913
 FCAB corporate site
 Antofagasta plc corporate site
 The Magic of the Andes - 1935 article.
 World-wide 30" Gauge Railways
 

Railway lines in Chile
Antofagasta Region
2 ft 6 in gauge railways in Chile
2 ft 6 in gauge railways in Bolivia
Metre gauge railways in Chile
Metre gauge railways in Bolivia
Companies based in Antofagasta Region
War of the Pacific